Club Sportiv Municipal Alexandria, commonly known as CSM Alexandria or simply as Alexandria, is a Romanian football club from Alexandria, Romania, founded in 1948. It plays in the Romanian Liga III and is one of the most important football clubs of Teleorman County.

Chronology of names

History

The club was founded under the name Unirea Alexandria in 1948.

The best known players are: Florea Voicilă (a player who represented the national team while playing in the second division for Alexandria) and Florică Mitroi – both home-grown players. Their best performance was 3rd place in the Romanian second league in 1982, above Rapid Bucharest ("Noi n-am uitat ca-n '82/ Voi ne-ati purtat prin Paradis/ Dupa Rapid erati si voi/ Pe locul 3, si n-a fost vis"-catren al regretatului dr. Jean Sardu...)

The club formed players like Dan Balauru, Valentin Badea and Basarab Panduru. These players played at the top level or even for the Romania national football team.

In 2009 the club lost the promotion play-off for Liga III losing 1–2 against Comprest București.
In spite of losing the playoff, the club managed to promote by an administrative decision; the Romanian Football Association announced that FCM Alexandria would play in 2010 in Liga III, Seria IV.

In the 2009–2010 season FCM finished in the middle of the table in eighth place.

In 2013 the club was relegated to the 4th division, Liga IV.

Honours

Domestic

Leagues
Liga III
Winners (4): 1961–62, 1973–74, 1997–98, 2001–02
Runners-up (6): 1969–70, 1985–86, 1987–88, 1988–89, 1990–91, 2017–18
Liga IV – Teleorman County
Winners (4): 1960–61, 1967–68, 2008–09, 2015–16
Runners-up  (2): 2013–14, 2014–15

Other performances
Appearances in Liga II: 16
Best finish in Liga II: 3rd place in 1981–82

Players

First team squad

Out on loan

Club officials

Board of directors

Current technical staff

League history

Famous managers

 Gheorghe Dungu
 Gabriel Raksi

References

External links

Football clubs in Teleorman County
Alexandria, Romania
Association football clubs established in 1948
Liga II clubs
Liga III clubs
Liga IV clubs
1948 establishments in Romania